Venturosa is a city in northeastern Brazil, in the State of Pernambuco. It lies in the mesoregion of Agreste of Pernambuco and has 338.12 sq/km of total area.

Geography
 State - Pernambuco
 Region - Agreste of Pernambuco
 Boundaries - Caetés and Capoeiras   (S);  Pesqueira and Alagoinha   (E);    Pedra  (W).
 Area - 338.12 km2
 Elevation - 530 m
 Hydrography - Ipojuca, Ipanema and Una rivers
 Vegetation - Caatinga Hipoxerófila
 Annual average temperature - 23.4 c
 Distance to Recife - 243 km

Economy

The main economic activities in Venturosa are industry, commerce and agribusiness, especially beans, corn; and  farming of cattle, sheep, goats, pigs and chickens.

Economic Indicators

Economy by Sector (2006)

Health Indicators

References

Municipalities in Pernambuco